Giacomo Finetti (died 1630) was an Italian Anconitan priest and composer. He was Maestro di cappella in the gran Casa of Venice.

References

Renaissance composers
1630 deaths
Year of birth unknown
Italian male classical composers
Italian classical composers